Chlidanthus is a genus that consists of 10 species of tender bulbs from tropical South America, mostly natives to the Andes. The botanical name comes from the Greek, meaning "delicate flower". The plants have large spherical bulbs with gray-green, strap-shaped leaves 30 cm long arising from the base. In late spring to early summer, clusters of 3-4 large, strong citrus-scented fragrant, funnel-shaped flowers 10–13 cm long held terminally on stalks 25 cm high, colored in yellow, pink or red.

Species
Chlidanthus boliviensis
Chlidanthus cardenasii
Chlidanthus cumingii
Chlidanthus ehrenbergii
Chlidanthus fragrans (perfumed fairy lily)
Chlidanthus luteus
Chlidanthus marginatus
Chlidanthus soratensis
Chlidanthus traubii
Chlidanthus yaviensis

References

Botanica Sistematica

Amaryllidoideae
Amaryllidaceae genera